Tesmart or Tassamert is a town and commune in Bordj Bou Arréridj Province, Algeria. It lies immediately west of Bordj Zemoura. According to the 1998 census it has a population of 5,269.

References

Communes of Bordj Bou Arréridj Province